Sarah Brightman: Dreamchaser in Concert is a live concert recording by Sarah Brightman following her 2012 release, Dreamchaser. It was recorded in June 2013 at the Elstree Studios near London, United Kingdom.

Dreamchaser In Concert has been released as a DVD for all the PBS Pledgers (United States) and it is available in different packages and Prices.

It has been released as a DVD and a Blu-ray disc only in Taiwan and Japan.

Track listing 
 Angel
 One Day Like This
 Éperdu
 Ave Maria
 Closer
 Glósóli
 Kaze No Torimichi
 Nessun Dorma
 A Song of India
 Venus and Mars
 Phantom of the Opera
 Deliver Me
 Scarborough Fair
 Time to Say Goodbye

References 

Sarah Brightman albums
2013 video albums